This is a list of notable events in country music that took place in the year 1977.

Events
June 25 — Waylon Jennings smash, "Luckenbach, Texas (Back to the Basics of Love)" spends its sixth week at No. 1 on the Billboard Hot Country Singles chart. It is just the third (and as it turned out, final) six-week No. 1 song of the 1970s, and will be the last song to spend as long atop the charts for 20 years (until 1997's "It's Your Love" by Tim McGraw and Faith Hill).
June 26 — Elvis Presley performs his final concert at Market Square Arena in Indianapolis, Indiana. It would later be televised on October 3 on CBS to bad reviews. 
December 31 — Dolly Parton's "Here You Come Again" spends its fifth week at No. 1 on the Billboard Hot Country Singles chart. It will be the last song to spend that long atop the chart until 1990's "Love Without End, Amen" by George Strait.

Top hits of the year

Number one hits

United States
(as certified by Billboard)

Notes
1^ No. 1 song of the year, as determined by Billboard.
A^ First Billboard No. 1 hit for that artist.
B^ Last Billboard No. 1 hit for that artist.
C^ Only Billboard No. 1 hit for that artist to date.

Canada
(as certified by RPM)

Notes
1^ No. 1 song of the year, as determined by RPM.
A^ First RPM No. 1 hit for that artist.
B^ Last RPM No. 1 hit for that artist.
C^ Only RPM No. 1 hit for that artist.

Other major hits

Singles released by American artists

Singles released by Canadian artists

Top new album releases

Other new albums

Births
 February 28 — Jason Aldean, male vocalist of the 2000s.
 May 3 – Eric Church, male vocalist starting in the late 2000s, best known for "Springsteen" and "Drink in My Hand."
 November 17 — Aaron Lines, Canadian country singer of the 2000s, best known for his hit "You Can't Hide Beautiful".
 November 20 — Josh Turner, deep bass-voiced singer of the 2000s, best known for "Why Don't We Just Dance" and "Time is Love."

Deaths
 March 22 – Stoney Cooper, 58, bluegrass and gospel singer who best known for his series of recordings with wife, Wilma Lee (as Wilma Lee and Stoney Cooper), from the 1940s through early 1960s.
 May 31 – Lloyd Perryman, 60, member of the Sons of the Pioneers.
 July 16 — Marg Osburne, 49, "The Girl from the Singing Hills", of CBC Radio and CBC Television fame.
 August 16 — Elvis Presley, 42, "The King," cross-genre celebrity who fused rhythm and blues, rockabilly and country music to become popular with country and rock audiences (heart failure).
 October 14 — Bing Crosby, 74, one of popular music's all-time leading performers; several of his 1930s and 1940s hits became hugely popular with country fans (including "Pistol Packin' Mama," the first-ever Billboard country No. 1 song). (heart attack)

Country Music Hall of Fame Inductees
Merle Travis (1917–1983)

Major awards

Grammy Awards
Best Female Country Vocal Performance — "Don't It Make My Brown Eyes Blue", Crystal Gayle
Best Male Country Vocal Performance — "Lucille", Kenny Rogers
Best Country Performance by a Duo or Group with Vocal — "Heaven's Just a Sin Away", The Kendalls
Best Country Instrumental Performance — "Country Instrumentalist of the Year", Hargus "Pig" Robbins
Best Country Song — "Don't It Make My Brown Eyes Blue", Richard Leigh (Performer: Crystal Gayle)

Juno Awards
Country Male Vocalist of the Year — Murray McLauchlan
Country Female Vocalist of the Year — Carroll Baker
Country Group or Duo of the Year — The Good Brothers

Academy of Country Music
Entertainer of the Year — Dolly Parton
Song of the Year — "Lucille", Roger Bowling and Hal Bynum (Performer: Kenny Rogers)
Single of the Year — "Lucille", Kenny Rogers
Album of the Year — Kenny Rogers, Kenny Rogers
Top Male Vocalist — Kenny Rogers
Top Female Vocalist — Crystal Gayle
Top Vocal Group — The Statler Brothers
Top New Male Vocalist — Eddie Rabbitt
Top New Female Vocalist — Debby Boone

Country Music Association
Entertainer of the Year — Ronnie Milsap
Song of the Year — "Lucille", Roger Bowling and Hal Bynum (Performer: Kenny Rogers)
Single of the Year — "Lucille", Kenny Rogers
Album of the Year — Ronnie Milsap Live, Ronnie Milsap
Male Vocalist of the Year — Ronnie Milsap
Female Vocalist of the Year — Crystal Gayle
Vocal Duo of the Year — Jim Ed Brown and Helen Cornelius
Vocal Group of the Year — The Statler Brothers
Instrumentalist of the Year — Roy Clark
Instrumental Group of the Year — Original Texas Playboys

Further reading
Kingsbury, Paul, "The Grand Ole Opry: History of Country Music. 70 Years of the Songs, the Stars and the Stories," Villard Books, Random House; Opryland USA, 1995
Kingsbury, Paul, "Vinyl Hayride: Country Music Album Covers 1947–1989," Country Music Foundation, 2003
Millard, Bob, "Country Music: 70 Years of America's Favorite Music," HarperCollins, New York, 1993
Whitburn, Joel, "Top Country Songs 1944–2005 – 6th Edition." 2005.

Other links
Country Music Association
Inductees of the Country Music Hall of Fame

External links
Country Music Hall of Fame

Country
Country music by year